Steven Watt may refer to:
Steven Watt (footballer) (born 1985), Scottish footballer
Steven Randy Watt, American Special Forces soldier